The 2010 Manly Warringah Sea Eagles season was the 61st in the club's history. Coached by Des Hasler and captained by Jamie Lyon & Jason King, they competed in the National Rugby League's 2010 Telstra Premiership, finishing the regular season 8th (out of 16), reaching the finals series. The Sea Eagles were then knocked out in their first finals match against eventual Premiers, St. George Illawarra Dragons.

The club had five of its players selected to play in the mid-season 2010 State of Origin series: Matt Ballin, Jamie Lyon, Jason King, Josh Perry and Anthony Watmough. Two of these players, Watmough and Perry, were selected to play internationally for Australia. Kieran Foran and Steve Matai were selected to play for New Zealand.

Awards:

NRL:

Roy Bull Best and Fairest: Jason King
Players' Player: Jamie Lyon
Leading point scorer: Jamie Lyon
Leading try scorer: Tony Williams
Rookie of the Year: Trent Hodkinson
Gordon Willoughby Medal (Members' player of the year): Jamie Lyon
(2nd place) Matt Ballin
(3rd place) Steve Matai
Steve Menzies Medal: "Barefoot" Bob Butcher
Doug Daley Memorial Clubman of the Year: George Rose

Under 20s:

Russ Bull Best and Fairest: Magnus Stromquist
Players' Player: Gary Riccardi

References

Manly Warringah Sea Eagles seasons
Manly Warringah Sea Eagles season